14 Blades (Chinese: 錦衣衛) is a 2010 wuxia film directed by Daniel Lee and starring Donnie Yen, Zhao Wei, Sammo Hung, Wu Chun, Kate Tsui, Qi Yuwu and Damian Lau. The film was released on 4 February 2010 in China and on 11 February 2010 in Hong Kong.

Plot
During the late Ming dynasty, the imperial court is plagued by corruption and the reigning emperor is incompetent. The Embroidered Uniform Guard (jinyiwei) consists of orphans trained in cruel, clandestine combat since childhood and they serve as the Ming government's secret service. Qinglong, a jinyiwei commander, is given a mechanical box of 14 blades to help him in his duties. Jia Jingzhong, an imperial eunuch close to the emperor, secretly plots a rebellion with the emperor's uncle, Prince Qing, who has been exiled after an unsuccessful rebellion.

Jia Jingzhong orders Qinglong to retrieve a safe box in the possession of the imperial councillor, Zhao Shenyang, whom he accuses of planning a revolt; Qinglong is told that the box contains proof of the councillor's treason. However, Qinglong soon discovers that the box actually contains the Imperial Seal, a symbol of the emperor's authority, which Jia Jingzhong needs to legitimise Prince Qing's authority. Qinglong is betrayed by his fellow jinyiwei and his brother-in-arms, Xuanwu, who has secretly pledged allegiance to Jia Jingzhong. Prince Qing's adoptive daughter, Tuo-Tuo, a deadly warrior, arrives to lend her assistance on receiving news of Qinglong's escape. Qinglong, now a fugitive and unable to leave the city until his wounds heal, finds his way to the Justice Security Service, a private security company whose fortunes are dwindling. The owner eagerly accepts Qinglong's offer to pay him handsomely for safe passage in hopes of revitalising his business. By coincidence, the owner's daughter, Qiao Hua, is engaged to be married, and the security service hides Qinglong within her wedding carriage as a means of getting past the checkpoints and leaving the city.

When another group of jinyiwei arrives to arrest Qinglong, he fights and kills them but unknowingly reveals his identity as a former jinyiwei himself. Fearing more trouble than they bargained for, the owner offers to return Qinglong's money and asks to be left in peace. However, Qinglong is determined to fulfil his duty to the emperor so he takes Qiao Hua as a hostage. The pair arrive at Yanmen Pass, where Qinglong hopes to gather information. He discovers that his enemies intend to sell three provinces to fund their cause. While Qinglong investigates and plots his next move, the duo encounters the Heaven's Eagles Gang, a group of bandits led by the self-proclaimed "Judge of the Desert". The leader is a strong warrior who fights Qinglong, proving that they are evenly matched. Qinglong proposes an alliance to raid the outpost at Yanmen Pass; the gang will get their full cut of the booty while Qinglong gets to satisfy his personal objectives. Standing in Qinglong's way are Jia Jingzhong's henchmen and his former jinyiwei, who have come to broker a deal with the gang. Before the raid is executed, Jia Jingzhong is betrayed and killed by Xuanwu, who intends to directly serve under Prince Qing.

Qinglong and the Heaven's Eagles Gang successfully raid the outpost and kill most of the soldiers. Qinglong overcomes Xuanwu in combat, but the latter escapes by yielding the Imperial Seal. Tuo-Tuo kidnaps Qiao Hua and demands the seal in return for freeing her. Qiao Hua is doubtful that Qinglong will make the trade, but Qinglong gives up the seal. However, he also makes it clear that he intends to take Qiao Hua to her fiancé. Duty-bound to recover the seal, Qinglong leaves Qiao Hua. Qinglong fights Tuo-Tuo at a tavern and he witnesses her striptease tactic. Qinglong reunites with the Justice Security Service and they catch up with Qinglong, offering to assist with their superior knowledge of the roads. Separately, the Judge of the Desert realises the importance of the Seal and leaves his gang to pursue the seal on his own.

Intercepting Tuo-Tuo, Xuanwu and Prince Qing's men arrive at the ruins of the ancient Sky Wolves City. Qinglong draws Tuo-Tuo into chasing a disguised Qiao Hua. Subsequently, Xuanwu and Prince Qing's men are split up and lured into an ambush set by the Justice Security Service and are defeated by Qinglong and the service. Xuanwu plays on Qinglong's guilt and mercy to escape execution but then attempts to kill Qinglong when his back is turned, forcing his hand. Tuo-Tuo eventually catches up with Qiao Hua and tells her Qinglong set her up to die for him, but the Judge of the Desert intervenes.  Realizing he is no match for Tuo-Tuo, the Judge sacrifices himself in combat to enable Qiao Hua to escape. After reuniting with Qinglong, he gives the seal to her and instructs her to bring it to the authorities to alert them of Prince Qing's conspiracy. Qiao Hua tells Qinglong she has declined her wedding proposal, suggesting she wants to be with Qinglong, but he believes he is likely to die; he tells her they will meet again if she rings a bell bracelet he had previously given her. Qinglong and Tuo-Tuo duel to the death in an abandoned temple. The fight intensifies and Tuo-Tuo strips down to her last robe. After Tuo-Tuo stabs Qinglong, Qinglong grabs hold of Tuo-Tuo and uses his box of 14 blades to kill both Tuo-Tuo and himself.

In the aftermath, Prince Qing's rebellion fails. He mourns Tuo-Tuo's death and commits suicide before being brought to trial. Qiao Hua's father passes away and she inherits the Justice Security Service. During her travels, she frequently detours along the desert roads to remember her adventures with Qinglong. On one such foray, while looking across the desert with her spyglass and ringing her bell, she sees a man who appears much like Qinglong in the distance.

Cast
Donnie Yen as Qinglong "青龍" or Azure Dragon.  The four senior officers of the Jinyiwei are given the names of the Four Symbols in the Chinese constellations.
Zhao Wei as Qiao Hua
Sammo Hung as Prince Qing (special appearance)
Wu Chun as Judge of the Desert
Kate Tsui as Tuo-Tuo
Qi Yuwu as Xuanwu "玄武" or Black Tortoise
Damian Lau as Zhao Shenyan (guest appearance)
Wu Ma as Qiao Yong
Law Kar-ying as Jia Jingzhong
Chen Kuan-tai as Fawang
Chen Zhihui as Baihu "白虎" or White Tiger
Fung Hak-on as advisor
Xu Xiangdong as Xiahou
Liu Zhuoling as servant
Zhang Yujiao as Zhao Shouzheng
Ding Wenbin as Jifeng
Jin Laiqun as Zhuque "朱雀" or Vermilion Bird
Qiu Bo
Bian Yang
Zhu Jiazhen

Production
14 Blades was scheduled to start filming on 14 May 2009 in Ningxia, China. Donnie Yen stated that he took the role of a villain in the film as he "wanted to tackle the role of a villain who discovers his humanity."

Release
14 Blades premiered in China and Singapore on 4 February 2010 and in Hong Kong on 11 February. The film premiered at the seventh place in the Hong Kong box office, grossing US$317,975 in its first week. It grossed a total of US$984,711 at the Hong Kong box office. The film was successful in Singapore where it was first in the box office on its second week, grossing a total of US$1,126,692 on its theatrical run. The film grossed a total of US$3,676,875 worldwide.

Reception
14 Blades was nominated for Best Action Choreography and Best Sound Design at the 29th Hong Kong Film Awards. The China Post praised Donnie Yen's acting ability and stated that the film was generally entertaining but criticised the action scenes, saying that "you never actually clearly see even one of the 14 blades. Unlike a really decent martial arts film, in which the battle scenes are well choreographed and you see the majority of the action, this film's fight scenes were only dynamic."

Many reviewers also criticised the film's heavy use of technology, including Kate Tsui's clothes-shedding technique. Film Business Asia gave the film a six out of ten, stating that 14 Blades has a  "script that becomes increasingly incoherent and restless editing that grows more and more distracting" and that the action scenes were "largely dependant on wire-fu and CG...when [Donnie] Yen is allowed to show his skills properly...14 Blades starts to look like the film it could have been."

Variety called 14 Blades an "above-average martial-arts actioner that reinforces Donnie Yen's "Man with No Name" ambience... Despite the circumstances, Qiao Hua falls in love with her captor, a development made believable by Zhao's warm and affecting perf. Yen's Eastwood-like poise is used to good effect here, and the romantic tension keeps the narrative effectively taut between the battle sequences."

The Hollywood Reporter wrote that the film "would have ended a mediocre film if not for the inventively designed and utilized weaponry (especially the titular 14 blades with different functions)" and had mixed reaction to the acting in the film, asserting that Donnie Yen's "stiff and steely demeanor actually works to his role's favor. The love interest with Qiao Hua is lame, especially with Zhao sleepwalking through another typecast role as playful, tomboyish heroine."

Awards and nominations
 17th Beijing College Student Film Festival
 Won: Favorite Actress (Zhao Wei)

 4th China (Ningbo) Famers Film Festival
 Won: Favorite Actress (Zhao Wei)

 29th Hong Kong Film Awards
 Nominated: Best Action Choreography (Guk Hin-chiu)
 Nominated: Best Sound Design (Ken Wong and Phyllis Cheng)

 19th Shanghai Film Critics Awards
 Won: Best Actress (Zhao Wei) also for Mulan (2009)
 Won :  Films of Merit

References

Further reading
 Hadi, Anita. "Razor sharp kung fu ." The Malay Mail. Thursday 11 February 2010.

External links
   
 

2010 films
2010s Mandarin-language films
2010 action films
Films directed by Daniel Lee
Films set in the Ming dynasty
Hong Kong historical action films
Hong Kong martial arts films
Kung fu films
Chinese martial arts films
Wushu films
Wuxia films
2010 martial arts films
2010s Hong Kong films